Maryam Jalaliyeh is a  road cyclist from Iran. She became  Iranian national road race and time trial champion in 2014.

References

External links
 profile at Procyclingstats.com

Iranian female cyclists
Living people
Place of birth missing (living people)
Date of birth missing (living people)
Year of birth missing (living people)